Leonardus Petrus Paulus "Lon" Pennock (22 May 1945, The Hague, – 9 March 2020, The Hague) was a Dutch sculptor, environmental artist, monumental artist and photographer.

Life and work  
Pennock studied sculpture at the Royal Academy of Art, The Hague from 1962 to 1967. He then continued his studies with a French scholarship to the École nationale supérieure des Beaux-Arts in Paris until 1968. 

In 1969 he received both the Buys van Hulten price as the Jacob Maris incentive price. Twice he was awarded a scholarship by the Ministry of Culture, Recreation and Social Work in 1973 and in 1979. Pennock was trained as a traditional sculptor, but quickly turned into an abstract, even minimalist artist. Pennock lived and worked in The Hague, where he was born. In 1983-84 together with Kees Verschuren he developed a structure plan for art in a recreation area in the town of Spaarnwoude. 

Pennock was director of the Willem de Kooning Academy in Rotterdam from 1979 to 1990. The 1984 sculpture in Rotterdam, working title The River (see image), was placed at the West Blaak not far from the front of the academy building.

Works  
 1969 Fish in Zoetermeer 
 1970 Waves in Košice, Slovakia
 1970 Untitled, Stormink Street in Deventer
 1972 Property, Mors Avenue in The Hague
 1973 L'homme in The Hague
 1973 Tree, High Prins Willem in Den Haag
 1974 Rhythm of three (Pilonen) in Bleiswijk 
 1975 Sluis in Amsterdam
 1976 Wind Sound and surroundings, North Sea Canal at IJmuiden
 1980 Balance of Sheets, Johan de Witt Laan / Stadhouderslaan in The Hague
 1981 Landmark in Maarssen
 1981 Intersection, Ockenburg in Den Haag
 1984 untitled in Rotterdam
 1984 untitled, hose tower fire department in Almere
 1987 The Arch in Amsterdam
 1987 Sheet with Frame, Sinjeur Semeynsweg in The Hague
 1989 Untitled in Rotterdam
 1993 Black Waves in Amsterdam
 1996 Intersection in The Hague image route Picture Gallery P. Struycken
 2000 Balance, Rathausvorplatz in Kaiserslautern
 2007 Antipode, Plantation in Schiedam
 2009 Agneta van Marken-Matthes [1], Agnetapark, Zocherweg, Delft

Gallery

1960-70s

1980s

1990s and later on

See also  
 List of Dutch sculptors

References

Further reading  
 Jean Leering: Vier constructies voor een plek (1994, Heemstede) Finale 
 Jean Leering e.a.: Skulptuur 1968-2003 (2003, Lannoo Tielt B.)

External links  

 Lon Pennock, Website

1945 births
2020 deaths
Dutch sculptors
Dutch male sculptors
Academic staff of Willem de Kooning Academy
Artists from The Hague